Horne (also Horn, Hoorn or Hoorne) is a small historic county of the Holy Roman Empire in the present day Netherlands and Belgium. It takes its name from the village Horn, west of Roermond. The residence of the counts of Horne was moved from Horn to Weert in the 15th century.

After the execution in 1568 of Philip de Montmorency who died without male heirs, the Prince-Bishop of Liège, as suzerain of Horne, was declared the direct lord and new count. The bishops ruled the county in personal union. Horne maintained its own laws and customs as well as its financial autonomy. The county included the communes of Neer, Nunhem, Haelen, Buggenum, Roggel, Heythuysen, Horne, Beegden, Geystingen and Ophoven.

It was suppressed in 1795, when it was occupied by the French, and it became part of the French département Meuse-Inférieure.

Rulers of Horne

Lords of Horne

 Engelbert de Hurne,
 Engelbert de Hurnen,
 Henry van Horn, † 1196
 William,
 Engelbert,
 Gerhard van Horn 
 William I., † 1264/65,
 Engelbert van Horn, 1212/64
 William II., † 1300/1301, 
 William III., † 1301,
 Gerhard I., † 1330, 
 Willem IV of Horne (Lord 1330-1343)
 Gerard II of Horne (Lord 1343-1345)
 Willem V of Horne (Lord 1345-1357) 
 Dirk Loef of Horne (Lord 1357-1368)
 Willem VI of Horne (Lord 1368-1405) † 1417, 
 William VII., † 1433,

Counts of Horne
 Jacob I., † 1488,
 Jacob II., † 1530,
 Jacob III., X 1531, 
 John, † 1540
 Philippe de Montmorency
 The prince-bishops of Liège, 1568-1795

References

Sources

 Detlev Schwennicke, Europäische Stammtafeln Band XVIII (1998) Tafel 62ff und Band XIV (1991) Tafel 122

County of Horne
County of Horne
1795 disestablishments in the Holy Roman Empire
States and territories established in the 920s
Counties of the Holy Roman Empire
920 establishments
10th-century establishments in the Holy Roman Empire
Southern Netherlands